Stefano Cuoghi (born 8 August 1959 in Modena) is an Italian association football coach and former professional player who played as a midfielder. He made 137 appearances in Serie A.

He is currently working with Perugia as Silvio Baldini's assistant, being appointed on that role on 20 September 2022.

Honours
Parma
 Coppa Italia winner: 1991–92
 UEFA Cup Winners' Cup winner: 1992–93

References

1959 births
Living people
Italian footballers
Association football midfielders
Serie A players
Serie B players
Serie C players
Modena F.C. players
A.C. Milan players
A.C. Perugia Calcio players
Pisa S.C. players
Parma Calcio 1913 players
Italian football managers
Italian expatriate sportspeople in Ukraine